"Fair Game" is a science fiction short story written by Philip K. Dick in 1953 and first published in 1959 in If Magazine. The story was re-published in the third collected volume of Dick's short stories, The Father-thing in 1987.

Plot
"Fair Game" centers on a man who believes he is being watched by something "god-like". Ultimately, the reader learns that the man is nothing more than game for malevolent creatures using Earth as a hunting ground.

References

External links
 
 "Fair Game" at the Internet Archive

Short stories by Philip K. Dick
1959 short stories
Works originally published in If (magazine)